The Medical Dental Building, located in Dallas, Texas, is listed on the National Register of Historic Places. Built in 1928 in the Art Deco/Art Moderne style, the nine story low-rise was originally known as the Jefferson Building.

See also
National Register of Historic Places listings in Dallas County, Texas

References

External links

1929 establishments in Texas
Art Deco architecture in Texas
Buildings and structures completed in 1929
National Register of Historic Places in Dallas
Office buildings on the National Register of Historic Places in Texas